is an urban quarter in the north of Hamburg, Germany in the Hamburg-Nord district. It is known as the site of Hamburg's international airport, and as the location of a prison which served as a concentration camp in the Nazi system of repression. As a result of boundary changes, JVA Fuhlsbüttel prison is now in Ohlsdorf, Hamburg.

History

In 1871, at the declaration of the German Reich the village of Fuhlsbüttel was given to the State of Hamburg.

Fuhlsbüttel airship base 
From 1912 Luftschiffhafen (Airship Port) Fuhlsbüttel was the first hangar and headquarters of the Marine-Luftschiff-Abteilung (Naval Airship Division) of the German Kaiserliche Marine (Imperial Navy). From there and several new bases  recon missions over the North Sea and bombing mission against England were flown during World War I.

Fuhlsbüttel concentration camp
On 4 September 1933, seven months after Hitler’s appointment as Chancellor of Germany,  parts of Fuhlsbüttel prison were converted into a concentration camp. It was initially placed under the command of the SA. Most of the inmates were Communists, Social Democrats and other political opponents of Nazism, Jews, Jehovah's Witnesses, Romani, homosexual men and others whom the regime wanted to lock up. In 1936, the Gestapo began running the camp, then called Polizeigefängnis Fuhlsbüttel (police prison). Over 700 people were interned in the camp following Kristallnacht in 1938. Fuhlsbüttel concentration camp was referred to in common parlance as KolaFu (abbreviated from Konzentrationslager Fuhlsbüttel) and became a synonym for oppression and death through hard labor. Fuhlsbüttel was often an initial point of incarceration for prisoners who were sent on to other camps such as Buchenwald, Esterwegen, Neuengamme, Ravensbrück or Sachsenhausen. The camp was liberated on 3 May 1945, by which time over 250 people had been murdered there.

There is a memorial for the camp nearby. 
A famous political prisoner held at the camp was First World War veteran – turned pacifist – Kapitänleutnant Hellmuth von Mücke. Women were also held at the camp, including Mary Pünjer, who was accused of lesbianism.

Geography

Climate
Fuhlsbuettel has a typical oceanic climate (Köppen: Cfb).

Demographics
As of 2006, 11,890 people were living in the Fuhlsbüttel quarter. In 1999 there were 6,768 households and 49.7% of all households were made up of individuals.

According to the Department of Motor Vehicles (Kraftfahrt-Bundesamt), 5,004 private vehicles were registered in the Fuhlsbüttel quarter (425 vehicles/1,000 people).

There were two elementary schools and one secondary school in the Fuhlsbüttel quarter and 26 physicians in private practice and five pharmacies.

Politics
These are the results of Fuhlsbüttel in the Hamburg state election:

Transport
Fuhlsbüttel is served by the Hamburg U-Bahn (underground) line U1, with two stations, Fuhlsbüttel and Fuhlsbüttel Nord (formerly called Flughafenstraße).

Since December 2008, Fuhlsbüttel has also been served by the Hamburg S-Bahn S1 with the Hamburg Airport station.

Notable buildings
St. Marien Lutheran Church

References

External links
  History of Satellite Camp Hamburg-Fuhlsbüttel Retrieved March 29, 2010
 Statistisches Amt für Hamburg und Schleswig-Holstein Office of Statistics for Hamburg and Schleswig-Holstein, official website. Retrieved March 29, 2010 

Quarters of Hamburg
Neuengamme concentration camp
Hamburg-Nord